Michiel Antonius Adrianus Beelen (born 25 May 1977 in Haarlem), better known as Giel Beelen, is a Dutch radio DJ and presenter, working primarily for public broadcaster VARA. Since 2004 Beelen hosted his own breakfast show GIEL! on national radio station 3FM.

In 2014 Beelen achieved a Guinness World Record for the longest radio DJ marathon ever, lasting 198 hours of non-stop broadcasting, after having improved the world record for the longest duration continuous crowd surfing in 2011.

Other shows Beelen presented were the Friday night show 'FreakNacht' from 1:00 to 4:00 am, as well as the extreme participation TV show Factor giel and a TV talk show called GielTV. In one part he and the interviewed person are naked (but largely this amounts to showing the bare shoulders).

Career 

From an early age, Beelen was determined to become a disc jockey. When he was just a little kid, he made himself a mock radio station to pretend he was a dj. After starting at a local Haarlem broadcasting company, presenting a show for kids, he soon moved to Radio 10 Gold and later to Radio Noordzee to work as an engineer.

In 1997 Beelen moved to the AVRO at Radio 3FM, where he hosted a show during night time.
 
In October 2003 he won a Dutch Marconi Award, for best radiomaker of 2003. He won the award again in 2005, 2006 & 2007.

From 2004 until 2017 Giel worked for the NPS, back to the VARA, to present his breakfast show 'GIEL!' and his Friday night show Nachtegiel, as part of 'The Friday Freak Night'. 
The Friday Freak night has also, Ekdom in de nacht ('Ekdom in the night'), presented by Gerard Ekdom, between 4.00 and 7.00 am.

Since 2017 Beelen has a morning show at Radio Veronica.

In 2004, 2005, 2006, 2008, 2009, 2010, 2012 and 2013 he lived in the Glass House (Het Glazen Huis) a week prior to Christmas without anything to eat to collect money for projects supported by the Red Cross in a show called Serious Request.

Events (co-)hosted 
 Serious Request in 2004, 2005, 2006, 2008, 2009, 2010 and 2012 as Radio DJ.
 Pinkpop in Landgraaf as Radio DJ, Reporter on Radio 3FM and TV Host, on Nederland 3.
 Liberation pop festival on Liberation Day in Haarlem.
 Student demonstration, on 30 November 2007 in Amsterdam.
 Dance4life event 2006.

External links 

  Official website of Giel Beelen
  Giel Beelen in 'Love'

References

1977 births
Living people
Dutch radio personalities
Dutch radio presenters
DJs from Haarlem